John Kendall may refer to:
John Kendall (MP for Bridgwater) (fl. 1467), see Bridgwater (UK Parliament constituency)
John Kendall (MP) (1631 – at least 1702)
John W. Kendall (1834–1892), American politician
Jack Kendall (John William Kendall, 1905–1961), English football goalkeeper active in the 1920s and 1930s
Jack Kendall (cricketer) (1921–2011), English cricketer
John D. Kendall (1917–2011), American music pedagogue
John Kendall (firefighter), fire chief and namesake of the John Kendall (fireboat)

See also
 John Kendall (fireboat)—commissioned 1930, decommissioned 1976, converted to a tugboat